Melvin Dell Robinson (born May 27, 1956) is a former American football running back who played six seasons in the National Football League (NFL) with the Detroit Lions, Atlanta Falcons and New England Patriots. He was drafted by the Lions in the third round of the 1979 NFL Draft. He played college football at West Texas A&M University and attended Lamesa High School in Lamesa, Texas.

References

External links
Just Sports Stats
College stats

Living people
1956 births
Players of American football from Texas
American football running backs
African-American players of American football
West Texas A&M Buffaloes football players
Detroit Lions players
Atlanta Falcons players
New England Patriots players
People from Lamesa, Texas
21st-century African-American people
20th-century African-American sportspeople